Kurdish Muslims (Kurdish: موسڵمانی کورد; Musilmanên Kurd) are Kurds who follow Islam, which is the largest religion among Kurds and has been for centuries. Kurds largely became Muslims in the 7th century.

History 
Before Islam, the majority of Kurds followed western Iranic Paganism which comes from Indo-Iranian tradition. Kurds made first contact with Islam in the 7th century during the Early Muslim conquests. Kurds were a nation divided between the Byzantine and Persian Empires, before being united under the Rashidun Caliphate. Jaban al-Kurdi and his son Meymun al-Kurdi were the first Kurds who converted to Islam, and they also were Muslim missionaries who helped introduce Islam to many other Kurds. Khalil al-Kurdi al-Semmani was one of the first Kurdish tabi'uns. Mass conversion of Kurds to Islam didn't happen until the reign of Umar ibn Al-Khattab, second caliph of the Rashidun Caliphate between 634 and 644. The Kurds first came into contact with the Muslim armies during the Muslim conquest of Persia in 637. The Kurdish tribes had been an important element in the Sasanian Empire, and initially gave strong support to the Sasanians as they tried to fight the Muslim armies, between 639 and 644. Although once it was clear that the Sassanids would soon fall, the Kurdish chiefs one by one submitted to the Muslim armies and agreed to accept Islam, leading to their tribe members doing the same. Today the majority of Kurds are Sunni Muslims, and there are Shia, Sufi, and Alevi minorities. Sunni Muslim Kurds are mostly Shafi'is. The percentage for Kurds who are Sunni Muslim is approximately 75% of all Kurds, and the percentage of Kurds who are Shia Muslim is approximately 15%.

Contemporary Kurdish Muslims 
Islam has gained strong support from Kurds and has historically acted as the back-bone of the Kurdish Movement.

After the secularization of Turkey, Turkish Kurdistan became the last stronghold of Islam, where Islamic schools were preserved, and many Turkish Muslim scholars went to Kurdistan in order to get the proper Islamic education. The first ever mosque in modern-day Turkey was Menüçehr Mosque, built in 1072 by the Kurdish Muslim dynasty Shaddadids.

After the rise of the Kurdish Islamism (a Kurdish nationalist and Islamist ideology) in the 1980s, the Kurdish Islamists used their Kurdish identity and Islam to defend themself against their main enemies, Iraq, Iran, Turkey, and Syria.

See also
 Muslims
 Bengali Muslims
 Punjabi Muslims

References

Kurdish Muslims
Islam in Kurdistan
Muslims by ethnicity